This is a list of events in Scottish television from 2003.

Events
6 January – Scottish and Grampian adopt the celebrity idents package, albeit with their own logos attached and with idents featuring a lot more Scottish personalities alongside those of ITV1.
27 April – Scottish soap High Road ends after 23 years and over 1,700 episodes. The series airs in some English regions until 2004.
1 May – Television coverage of the 2003 Scottish Parliament general election.
17 December – BBC Scotland will not pursue the idea of a Scottish Six news programme, following a major review of output which indicated that a majority of viewers are satisfied with the status quo.

Debuts

BBC
29 October – Blue Heaven (2003)
Unknown – The Karen Dunbar Show

Television series
Scotsport (1957–2008)
Reporting Scotland (1968–1983; 1984–present)
Scotland Today (1972–2009)
Sportscene (1975–present)
The Beechgrove Garden (1978–present)
Grampian Today (1980–2009)
Taggart (1983–2010)
Crossfire (1984–2004)
Win, Lose or Draw (1990–2004)
Only an Excuse? (1993–2020)
Monarch of the Glen (2000–2005)
Balamory (2002–2005)
Jeopardy (2002–2004)
Still Game (2002–2007; 2016–2019)
River City (2002–present)

Ending this year
27 April – High Road (1980–2003)
3 December – Blue Heaven (2003)
Unknown – Live Floor Show (2002–2003)

Deaths
26 November – Gordon Reid, 64, actor

See also
2003 in Scotland

References

 
Television in Scotland by year
2000s in Scottish television